Victoria Park state by-election may refer to:

 2006 Victoria Park state by-election
 1945 Victoria Park state by-election